This is the discography of Okinawan musician Rimi Natsukawa.

Albums

Studio albums

Cover albums

Compilations albums

Singles

Other appearances

{| class="wikitable" style="text-align:center"
|- bgcolor="#CCCCCC"
! rowspan="1"| Release
! rowspan="1"| Artist
! rowspan="1"| Title
! rowspan="1"| Notes
! rowspan="1"| Album
|-
| rowspan="1"|2004
| align="left"|Hiroshi Itsuki feat. Rimi Natsukawa
| align="left"|
| align="left"|
|align="left" rowspan="1"|Onna no Ehon
|-
| rowspan="3"|2005
| align="left"|Chikuzen Sato with Rimi Natsukawa
| align="left"|
| align="left"|Features on "Rimits: Best Duet Songs" (2006)
|align="left" rowspan="1"|The Selection of Cornerstones 1995-2004
|-
| align="left"|Rimi Natsukawa
| align="left"|{{nihongo|Aa Kōshien' Kimi yo Hachigatsu ni Atsuku Nare|「あゝ甲子園」君よ八月に熱くなれ|You Make Me Hot in August (from Ah, Kōshien)}}
| align="left"|
|align="left" rowspan="1"|Ningen Manyōka: Yū Aku Kashishū|-
| align="left"|Kaoru Kurosawa duet with Rimi Natsukawa
| align="left"|
| align="left"|Features on "Rimits: Best Duet Songs" (2006)
|align="left" rowspan="1"|Love Anthem|-
| rowspan="1"|2006
| align="left"|Andrea Bocelli duet with Rimi Natsukawa
| align="left"|
| align="left"|Features on "Umui Kaji" (2007)
|align="left" rowspan="1"|Amore (Japanese Edition)|-
| rowspan="1"|2008
| align="left"|Taiyo Yamazawa presents Rimi Natsukawa
| align="left"|
| align="left"|
|align="left" rowspan="1"|Music Tree|-
| rowspan="2"|2009
| align="left"|Chage with Rimi Natsukawa
| align="left"|
| align="left"|
|align="left" rowspan="1"|Many Happy Returns|-
| align="left"|Rimi Natsukawa
| align="left"|
| align="left"|
|align="left" rowspan="1"|Katsuhisa Hattori''
|}

VHS/DVD
 - February 25, 2004Rimi Natsukawa Concert Tour 2004: Unrimited - March 24, 2005Video Clip Collection''' - March 9, 2007

Pop music discographies
Discographies of Japanese artists